Mireia Boya Busquet (born 1979) is a Catalan scientist, activist, and politician from Spain. She is a councilor of the Aran municipality of Les. Since February 2018 she has been part of the national secretariat of the Popular Unity Candidacy (CUP). She was a member of the Catalan Parliament from 2016 to 2017.

Biography
The daughter of Ernesto Boya and the politician Maria Pilar Busquets, she has a degree in Environmental Sciences from the Autonomous University of Barcelona (2002), a master's degree in Landscape Design (2004), and a PhD in Land Management and Planning (2009) from the Université de Montréal. In the professional field, she is a consultant and adjunct lecturer
("asociada")  of the Humanities Department of Pompeu Fabra University.

Mireia Boya Busquet has been a fighter for the recognition of Occitan identity of the Valley of Aran, and was the first member of the Catalan Parliament to use the Aranese dialect in the Parliament of Catalonia. Her brother, has been general director of Archives, Libraries, Museum, and Heritage of the Generalitat beginning in January 2016, an office that he was dismissed from after the 2017 suspension of Catalonian self-government.

Political career
Boya is a founder and former coordinator of the Assemblea Nacional Catalana in Val d'Aran and councilor in the city of Les for the Corròp party, framed in Occitan nationalism. In the 2015 elections to the Parliament of Catalonia, she was a candidate of the CUP for the district of Lleida, after a vote in primaries. Boya, who was second in the list in her constituency, was not elected, but on 18 December 2015, during the tense negotiations between the CUP and the pro-independence coalition Junts pel Sí, the CUP's number one, Ramon Usall, resigned for personal reasons. In this way, Boya occupied the post of regional parliamentarian. She participated in the plenary sessions of the Parliament that voted for the roadmap to independence for Catalonia, and voted the Unilateral declaration of Independence of Catalonia.

In the elections of 21 December 2017, of the 5,265 votes cast in Val d'Aran, the CUP received 174 – 3.3% of the total.

In February 2018, she was elected a member of the CUP National Secretariat as an independent candidate with 662 votes.

Occitan nationalism
A defender of the Occitan nation, Boya upholds a "project of a country with two languages of its own", a country that looks "to the north, to Occitania".

Judicial case

Boya was declared as investigated on 14 February 2018, being released without precautionary measures.

References

External links
 

1979 births
Aranese people
Autonomous University of Barcelona alumni
Environmental scientists
Living people
Members of the 11th Parliament of Catalonia
21st-century Spanish women politicians
Occitan-speaking people
People from Saint-Gaudens, Haute-Garonne
Academic staff of Pompeu Fabra University
Popular Unity Candidacy politicians
Université de Montréal alumni
Women members of the Parliament of Catalonia